In organic chemistry, a carboxylic acid is an organic acid that contains a carboxyl group attached to an R-group. Carboxylic acids occur widely. Important examples include the amino acids and fatty acids. Deprotonation of a carboxylic acid gives a carboxylate anion.

Examples and nomenclature
Carboxylic acids are commonly identified by their trivial names. They often have the suffix -ic acid. IUPAC-recommended names also exist; in this system, carboxylic acids have an -oic acid suffix. For example, butyric acid (C3H7CO2H) is butanoic acid by IUPAC guidelines. For nomenclature of complex molecules containing a carboxylic acid, the carboxyl can be considered position one of the parent chain even if there are other substituents, such as 3-chloropropanoic acid. Alternately, it can be named as a "carboxy" or "carboxylic acid" substituent on another parent structure, such as 2-carboxyfuran.

The carboxylate anion (R–COO− or RCO2−) of a carboxylic acid is usually named with the suffix -ate, in keeping with the general pattern of -ic acid and -ate for a conjugate acid and its conjugate base, respectively. For example, the conjugate base of acetic acid is acetate.

Carbonic acid, which occurs in bicarbonate buffer systems in nature, is not generally classed as one of the carboxylic acids, despite that it has a moiety that looks like a COOH group.

Physical properties

Solubility
Carboxylic acids are polar. Because they are both hydrogen-bond acceptors (the carbonyl –C=O) and hydrogen-bond donors (the hydroxyl –OH), they also participate in hydrogen bonding. Together, the hydroxyl and carbonyl group form the functional group carboxyl. Carboxylic acids usually exist as dimers in nonpolar media due to their tendency to "self-associate". Smaller carboxylic acids (1 to 5 carbons) are soluble in water, whereas bigger carboxylic acids have limited solubility due to the increasing hydrophobic nature of the alkyl chain. These longer chain acids tend to be soluble in less-polar solvents such as ethers and alcohols. Aqueous sodium hydroxide and carboxylic acids, even hydrophobic ones, react to yield water-soluble sodium salts. For example, enanthic acid has a low solubility in water (0.2 g/L), but its sodium salt is very soluble in water.

Boiling points
Carboxylic acids tend to have higher boiling points than water, because of their greater surface areas and their tendency to form stabilised dimers through hydrogen bonds. For boiling to occur, either the dimer bonds must be broken or the entire dimer arrangement must be vaporised, increasing the enthalpy of vaporization requirements significantly.

Acidity
Carboxylic acids are Brønsted–Lowry acids because they are proton (H+) donors. They are the most common type of organic acid.

Carboxylic acids are typically weak acids, meaning that they only partially dissociate into H3O+ cations and RCOO− anions in neutral aqueous solution. For example, at room temperature, in a 1-molar solution of acetic acid, only 0.001% of the acid are dissociated (i.e. 10−5 moles out of 1 mol). Electron-withdrawing substituents, such as -CF3 group, give stronger acids (the pKa of formic acid is 3.75 whereas trifluoroacetic acid, with a trifluoromethyl substituent, has a pKa of 0.23). Electron-donating substituents give weaker acids (the pKa of formic acid is 3.75 whereas acetic acid, with a methyl substituent, has a pKa of 4.76)

Deprotonation of carboxylic acids gives carboxylate anions; these are resonance stabilized, because the negative charge is delocalized over the two oxygen atoms, increasing the stability of the anion. Each of the carbon–oxygen bonds in the carboxylate anion has a partial double-bond character. The carbonyl carbon's partial positive charge is also weakened by the -1/2 negative charges on the 2 oxygen atoms.

Odour
Carboxylic acids often have strong sour odours. Esters of carboxylic acids tend to have fruity, pleasant odours, and many are used in perfume.

Characterization 
Carboxylic acids are readily identified as such by infrared spectroscopy. They exhibit a sharp band associated with vibration of the C=O carbonyl bond (νC=O) between 1680 and 1725 cm−1. A characteristic νO–H band appears as a broad peak in the 2500 to 3000 cm−1 region. By 1H NMR spectrometry, the hydroxyl hydrogen appears in the 10–13 ppm region, although it is often either broadened or not observed owing to exchange with traces of water.

Occurrence and applications
Many carboxylic acids are produced industrially on a large scale. They are also frequently found in nature. Esters of fatty acids are the main components of lipids and polyamides of aminocarboxylic acids are the main components of proteins.

Carboxylic acids are used in the production of polymers, pharmaceuticals, solvents, and food additives. Industrially important carboxylic acids include acetic acid (component of vinegar, precursor to solvents and coatings), acrylic and methacrylic acids (precursors to polymers, adhesives), adipic acid (polymers), citric acid (a flavor and preservative in food and beverages), ethylenediaminetetraacetic acid (chelating agent), fatty acids (coatings), maleic acid (polymers), propionic acid (food preservative), terephthalic acid (polymers). Important carboxylate salts are soaps.

Synthesis

Industrial routes
In general, industrial routes to carboxylic acids differ from those used on a smaller scale because they require specialized equipment.
Carbonylation of alcohols as illustrated by the Cativa process for the production of acetic acid.  Formic acid is prepared by a different carbonylation pathway, also starting from methanol.
Oxidation of aldehydes with air using cobalt and manganese catalysts. The required aldehydes are readily obtained from alkenes by hydroformylation.
Oxidation of hydrocarbons using air. For simple alkanes, this method is inexpensive but not selective enough to be useful. Allylic and benzylic compounds undergo more selective oxidations. Alkyl groups on a benzene ring are oxidized to the carboxylic acid, regardless of its chain length. Benzoic acid from toluene, terephthalic acid from para-xylene, and phthalic acid from ortho-xylene are illustrative large-scale conversions. Acrylic acid is generated from propene.
Oxidation of ethene using silicotungstic acid catalyst.
Base-catalyzed dehydrogenation of alcohols.
Carbonylation coupled to the addition of water. This method is effective and versatile for alkenes that generate secondary and tertiary carbocations, e.g. isobutylene to pivalic acid. In the Koch reaction, the addition of water and carbon monoxide to alkenes is catalyzed by strong acids. Hydrocarboxylations involve the simultaneous addition of water and CO. Such reactions are sometimes called "Reppe chemistry."
HCCH + CO + H2O  → CH2=CHCO2H

 Hydrolysis of triglycerides obtained from plant or animal oils. These methods of synthesizing some long-chain carboxylic acids are related to soap making.
Fermentation of ethanol. This method is used in the production of vinegar.
The Kolbe–Schmitt reaction provides a route to salicylic acid, precursor to aspirin.

Laboratory methods
Preparative methods for small scale reactions for research or for production of fine chemicals often employ expensive consumable reagents.
Oxidation of primary alcohols or aldehydes with strong oxidants such as potassium dichromate, Jones reagent, potassium permanganate, or sodium chlorite. The method is more suitable for laboratory conditions than the industrial use of air, which is "greener" because it yields less inorganic side products such as chromium or manganese oxides.
Oxidative cleavage of olefins by ozonolysis, potassium permanganate, or potassium dichromate.
Hydrolysis of nitriles, esters, or amides, usually with acid- or base-catalysis.
Carbonation of a Grignard reagent and organolithium reagents:
RLi + CO2 → RCO2Li
RCO2Li + HCl →  RCO2H + LiCl
 Halogenation followed by hydrolysis of methyl ketones in the haloform reaction
 Base-catalyzed cleavage of non-enolizable ketones, especially aryl ketones:
RC(O)Ar  +  H2O  →  RCO2H  +  ArH

Less-common reactions
Many reactions produce carboxylic acids but are used only in specific cases or are mainly of academic interest.
 Disproportionation of an aldehyde in the Cannizzaro reaction
 Rearrangement of diketones in the benzilic acid rearrangement
 Involving the generation of benzoic acids are the von Richter reaction from nitrobenzenes and the Kolbe–Schmitt reaction from phenols.

Reactions

The most widely practiced reactions convert carboxylic acids into esters, amides, carboxylate salts, acid chlorides, and alcohols. Carboxylic acids react with bases to form carboxylate salts, in which the hydrogen of the hydroxyl (–OH) group is replaced with a metal cation. For example, acetic acid found in vinegar reacts with sodium bicarbonate (baking soda) to form sodium acetate, carbon dioxide, and water:
CH3COOH + NaHCO3 → CH3COO−Na+ + CO2 + H2O

Carboxylic acids also react with alcohols to give esters. This process is widely used, e.g. in the production of polyesters. Likewise, carboxylic acids are converted into amides, but this conversion typically does not occur by direct reaction of the carboxylic acid and the amine. Instead esters are typical precursors to amides. The conversion of amino acids into peptides is a significant biochemical process that requires ATP.

The hydroxyl group on carboxylic acids may be replaced with a chlorine atom using thionyl chloride to give acyl chlorides. In nature, carboxylic acids are converted to thioesters.

Reduction 
Like esters, most carboxylic acids can be reduced to alcohols by hydrogenation, or using hydride transferring agents such as lithium aluminium hydride. Strong alkyl transferring agents, such as organolithium compounds but not Grignard reagents, will reduce carboxylic acids to ketones along with transfer of the alkyl group.

N,N-Dimethyl(chloromethylene)ammonium chloride (ClHC=N+(CH3)2Cl−) is a highly chemoselective agent for carboxylic acid reduction. It selectively activates the carboxylic acid to give the carboxymethyleneammonium salt, which can be reduced by a mild reductant like lithium tris(t-butoxy)aluminum hydride to afford an aldehyde in a one pot procedure.   This procedure is known to tolerate reactive carbonyl functionalities such as ketone as well as moderately reactive ester, olefin, nitrile, and halide moieties.

Specialized reactions
 As with all carbonyl compounds, the protons on the α-carbon are labile due to keto–enol tautomerization. Thus, the α-carbon is easily halogenated in the Hell–Volhard–Zelinsky halogenation.
 The Schmidt reaction converts carboxylic acids to amines.
 Carboxylic acids are decarboxylated in the Hunsdiecker reaction.
 The Dakin–West reaction converts an amino acid to the corresponding amino ketone.
 In the Barbier–Wieland degradation, a carboxylic acid on an aliphatic chain having a simple methylene bridge at the alpha position can have the chain shortened by one carbon. The inverse procedure is the Arndt–Eistert synthesis, where an acid is converted into acyl halide, which is then reacted with diazomethane to give one additional methylene in the aliphatic chain.
 Many acids undergo oxidative decarboxylation. Enzymes that catalyze these reactions are known as carboxylases (EC 6.4.1) and decarboxylases (EC 4.1.1).
 Carboxylic acids are reduced to aldehydes via the ester and DIBAL, via the acid chloride in the Rosenmund reduction and via the thioester in the Fukuyama reduction.
 In ketonic decarboxylation carboxylic acids are converted to ketones.
 Organolithium reagents (>2 equiv) react with carboxylic acids to give a dilithium 1,1-diolate, a stable tetrahedral intermediate which decomposes to give a ketone upon acidic workup.
 The Kolbe electrolysis is an electrolytic, decarboxylative dimerization reaction. It gets rid of the carboxyl groups of two acid molecules, and joins the remaining fragments together.

Carboxyl radical
The carboxyl radical, •COOH, only exists briefly. The acid dissociation constant of •COOH has been measured using electron paramagnetic resonance spectroscopy. The carboxyl group tends to dimerise to form oxalic acid.

See also
 Acid anhydride
 Acid chloride
 Amide
 Amino acid
 Ester
 List of carboxylic acids
 Dicarboxylic acid
 Polyhydroxy carboxylic acid (PHC). Pseudoacid
 Thiocarboxy

References

External links

 Carboxylic acids pH and titration – freeware for calculations, data analysis, simulation, and distribution diagram generation
 PHC.

 
Functional groups